Jesse N. Schell (born June 13, 1970) is an American video game designer, author, CEO of Schell Games, and a distinguished professor of the practice of entertainment technology at CMU's Entertainment Technology Center (ETC), a joint master's program between the College of Fine Arts and School of Computer Science in Pittsburgh, Pennsylvania.

Schell earned a bachelor's degree in computer science from Rensselaer Polytechnic Institute (RPI) and subsequently, earned a master's degree in Information Networking from Carnegie Mellon University. His early career consisted of his work as a Software Engineer for IBM and Bell Communications Research. He then moved to Los Angeles to work with Disney Imagineering.

Additionally, Schell has also been a writer, director, performer, juggler, comedian, and circus artist for both Freihofer's Mime Circus and the Juggler's Guild.

Career
After graduating from the Information Networking Institute at CMU in 1994 with a Master of Science in computer networking and virtual reality, Jesse Schell went on to work for Bell Labs. In 1995 he joined Walt Disney Imagineering, where he worked for seven years in the capacity of programmer, manager, designer, and creative director on several projects. These included rides for theme parks like DisneyQuest and massively multiplayer online games like Toontown Online. During his time at Disney, he met Carnegie Mellon professor Randy Pausch, who was taking a sabbatical in the lab where Schell worked. When Pausch founded the Entertainment Technology Center at CMU, he invited Schell to become a faculty member. Schell joined the faculty in 2002.

In 2002, Schell founded Schell Games. The company is based in Pittsburgh, PA and employs more than 100 people. He currently serves as CEO. At Tech 50 in 2016, Schell was awarded CEO of the year, and the year prior, Schell was named one of Pittsburgh's 50 most powerful people.

In 2008, Schell published The Art of Game Design. A second edition of this book was published in 2014.

He continues to teach Building Virtual Worlds and Game Design at the ETC.

Schell is known for his talks on game design, but is best known for his DICE 2010 talk, "Beyond Facebook", which was adopted as a TED "Best of the Web" talk.

In 2015, Schell was awarded with a Carnegie Science Award in the entrepreneur category. The program celebrates innovators who have distinguished themselves by making contributions to science and technology in various disciplines. The following year, Schell received a 2016 Creator-of-the-Year award at the CREATE Festival.

Since 2016, Schell has been in talks with Disney about reviving Toontown Online. As of August 2018, Schell noted that he is actively talking to Disney about obtaining the rights to Toontown Online.

Games and rides
Schell contributed to the development of certain video games and rides.

Games
 Toontown Online
 Pirates of the Caribbean Online
 Pixie Hollow

Rides
 Pirates of the Caribbean: Battle for Buccaneer Gold
 Toy Story Midway Mania

References

External links

General
 Schell in a Handbasket - Official website

Talks
 DICE 2013: "The Secret Mechanisms" - 2013 talk that expands on his acclaimed 2010 DICE presentation
 DICE 2010: "Beyond Facebook" - 2010 talk exploring the world of game development beyond the Facebook era
 TEDxUniPittsburgh: "The Future is Beautiful" - 2010 talk about using games to improve education
 "Visions of the Gamepocalypse" - 2010 talk about gamification
 ARE2010 Keynote: "Seeing" - 2010 talk about seeing augmented reality with new eyes
 Unite Conference 2010: "Who will we talk to? Our Virtual Companions" - 2010 talk that focuses on the future of virtual characters.

1970 births
Living people
American video game designers
Carnegie Mellon University alumni
Carnegie Mellon University faculty
American chief executives